VA-174 or VA 174 may refer to:

 Attack Squadron 174 (U.S. Navy), an aviation unit of the United States Navy
 Virginia State Route 174, a road in the Commonwealth of Virginia, USA